The Saddlestone is a small nunatak, 380 m, standing between Mount Carroll and The Pyramid, in the north part of Tabarin Peninsula in the Antarctic Peninsula. It rises 45 m above the ice sheet at the head of Kenney Glacier. Surveyed in 1955 by Falkland Islands Dependencies Survey (FIDS), who applied the descriptive name; saddlestone is an architectural term for the stone at the apex of a pediment or gable.

Nunataks of Trinity Peninsula